The 2016 Towson Tigers football team represented Towson University in the 2016 NCAA Division I FCS football season. They were led by eighth-year head coach Rob Ambrose and played their home games at Johnny Unitas Stadium. They were a member of the Colonial Athletic Association. They finished the season 4–7, 3–5 in CAA play to finish in a tie for eighth place.

Schedule

Game summaries

at South Florida

Saint Francis (PA)

at Villanova

at Richmond

Stony Brook

at Dartmouth

New Hampshire

at Delaware

Elon

William & Mary

at Rhode Island

Ranking movements

References

Towson
Towson Tigers football seasons
Towson Tigers football